An election to Mayo County Council took place on 27 June 1991 as part of that year's Irish local elections. 31 councillors were elected from seven electoral divisions by PR-STV voting for a five-year term of office.

Results by party

Results by Electoral Area

Ballina

Castlebar

Claremorris

Killala

Swinford

Westport

External links
 Official website

1991 Irish local elections
1991